The 1993 Brisbane Rugby League season was the 72nd season of semi-professional top level rugby league in Brisbane, Queensland, Australia.

Teams

Source:

Regular season 
Easts Tigers halfback Paul Green won the Rothmans Medal for the best and fairest player in the competition.

Final
Western Suburbs 18 (Tries: M. Maguire 2, D. Mills 2; Goal G. Kerr) def. Eastern Suburbs 12 (Tries: P. Green, P. Sinclair; Goals: R. Cannon, P. Green) at Lang Park.

References

Rugby league in Brisbane
1993 in Australian rugby league